Witchcraft is a 2010 studio album by Claire Martin and Richard Rodney Bennett.

References 

2010 albums
Claire Martin (singer) albums
Richard Rodney Bennett albums
Linn Records albums